Corey James Dillon (born October 24, 1974) is an American former professional football player who was a running back in the National Football League (NFL) for ten seasons with the Cincinnati Bengals and New England Patriots. Dillon played college football at Washington and was selected by the Bengals in the second round of the 1997 NFL Draft.

Despite experiencing little team success, Dillon emerged as a standout player during his seven years in Cincinnati by setting several franchise records and receiving three Pro Bowl selections. During his last three seasons, he played for the Patriots, where he was named to a fourth Pro Bowl and contributed to New England's victory in Super Bowl XXXIX. He retired with over 11,000 rushing yards and is 20th in NFL rushing yards.

High school career
Born and raised in Seattle, Washington, Dillon attended Franklin High School, where he teamed with his cousin, Ed Raiford, to form one of the state's all-time twosomes for the Quakers football team. Dillon and Raiford garnered Parade, USA, Best In The West and Tom Flemming All-American awards. Both were two-sport standouts, Raiford also starred as an All-State basketball player while Dillon starred in baseball. An excellent baseball catcher, Dillon garnered All-Metro honors, and was selected by the San Diego Padres in the 1993 Major League Baseball draft.

College career
Dillon played junior college football as a freshman at Garden City Community College in Kansas, and rushed for 1165 yards and 16 TDs in 1994. The following year, he played for Dixie State College in St. George, Utah, and rushed for 1899 yards and 20 TDs in 279 attempts. Dillon was chosen JC Offensive Back of the Year by College Sports magazine.

At the University of Washington in Seattle, he was known for using a very aggressive and punishing style of running. Dillon set the team all-time single-season records for rushing yards (1,695 yards) and touchdowns scored (24) in 1996. In the first quarter against San Jose State in mid-November, Dillon rushed for 222 yards and caught an 83-yard touchdown pass, setting NCAA records for both rushing yards and all-purpose yards (305) in one quarter. Dillon did not re-enter the game as the Huskies were comfortably ahead 25–0 by the end of the first quarter on a cold and rainy afternoon. The Dawgs led 43–3 at the half and won 53–10.

In the 1996 Holiday Bowl against Colorado, Dillon rushed for 140 yards and added 2 more touchdowns to his regular-season total of 23. He scored 5 TDs in 41–21 conquest of UCLA, earning Sports Illustrated National Player of the Week honors as he rushed for 145 yards and added 53 yards in receptions.

Professional career

Cincinnati Bengals
The Cincinnati Bengals selected Dillon in the second round of the 1997 NFL Draft, the 43rd overall pick. During his first season in 1997, Dillon rushed 39 times for 246 yards and 4 touchdowns in a 41–14 win over the Tennessee Oilers, breaking Jim Brown's rookie single-game record that had stood for 40 years. That game remains a Bengals rookie record for carries, yards, and touchdowns, and franchise record for touchdowns. His 1,129 yards that season is also still a Bengals rookie record. 
For six seasons, Dillon was one of the few bright spots on otherwise struggling Bengals teams. Dillon voiced his frustrations with the team and owner Mike Brown, stating "we will never win with the Brown family in Cincinnati," after a 2001 game. 
From 1997 to 2002, he rushed for over 1,000 yards each year, and made the Pro Bowl 3 times from 1999 to 2001. On October 22, 2000, Dillon set an NFL record for most yards rushed in one game (278 yards) against the Denver Broncos, breaking Walter Payton's single-game mark of 275 yards set in 1977. That record has since been broken by Jamal Lewis (295 yards) on September 14, 2003, and Adrian Peterson (296 yards) on November 4, 2007. Dillon's mark remains a franchise record for yards and yards-per-carry (12.64).

In 2003, Dillon only rushed for 541 yards due to injury.

New England Patriots
In 2004, Dillon was traded to the New England Patriots for a second-round pick. 
In the 2004 season, Dillon set career highs and franchise records with 1,635 rushing yards and 12 touchdowns. He was a major factor in the Patriots' win over the Indianapolis Colts in New England's first playoff game that season, rushing for 144 yards and catching 5 passes for 17 yards. New England won its third Super Bowl, due in no small part to the running game built around Dillon. He was the top rusher of Super Bowl XXXIX with 75 rushing yards and a touchdown, while also catching 3 passes for 31 yards, for 106 total yards. Overall, Dillon rushed for a total of 292 yards, caught 9 passes for 53 yards, and scored 2 touchdowns in New England's 3 postseason games.

In 2005, while injury problems plagued Dillon and he was not able to duplicate his stats from 2004, he remained a major contributor to the team, rushing for 733 yards and 12 touchdowns in 12 games. The Patriots used Dillon more frequently as a pass receiver, with 23 receptions for 193 yards and a touchdown, which was more receiving yards than he had gained in his past 2 seasons combined.

In the 2006 season, Dillon began sharing the team's rushing duties with rookie running back Laurence Maroney. With the retirement of Curtis Martin, he spent his final year as the NFL's active leader in career rushing yards. He finished the year with 812 rushing yards and a career-high 13 touchdowns, tied him for third in the league that season.

Retirement
The Patriots released Dillon on March 2, 2007. Dillon subsequently told the Boston Globe in August that he would retire from the NFL. A month later, Dillon admitted to considering a comeback with the Patriots with the season-ending injury to RB Sammy Morris, but ultimately remained retired.

NFL career statistics

Regular season

Personal life
Dillon has three daughters with his ex-wife, who filed for divorce in April 2010.

See also

 List of NCAA major college football yearly scoring leaders
 Washington Huskies football statistical leaders

Notes

References

External links
 

1974 births
African-American players of American football
American Conference Pro Bowl players
American football running backs
Cincinnati Bengals players
Utah Tech Trailblazers football players
Living people
New England Patriots players
Washington Huskies football players
Players of American football from Seattle
People from Calabasas, California
Garden City Broncbusters football players
Franklin High School (Seattle) alumni
21st-century African-American sportspeople
20th-century African-American sportspeople